The 133rd New York State Legislature, consisting of the New York State Senate and the New York State Assembly, met from January 5 to July 1, 1910, during the fourth year of Charles Evans Hughes's governorship, in Albany.

Background
Under the provisions of the New York Constitution of 1894, re-apportioned in 1906 and 1907, 51 Senators and 150 assemblymen were elected in single-seat districts; senators for a two-year term, assemblymen for a one-year term. The senatorial districts were made up of entire counties, except New York County (twelve districts), Kings County (eight districts), Erie County (three districts) and Monroe County (two districts). The Assembly districts were made up of contiguous area, all within the same county.

At this time there were two major political parties: the Republican Party and the Democratic Party.

Elections
The New York state election, 1909, was held on November 2. No statewide elective offices were up for election.

Sessions
On January 4, the Republican state senators met in caucus and nominated Jotham P. Allds for president pro tempore. Eight senators (Agnew, Brackett, Conger, Cordts, Davenport, Hinman, Newcomb and Rose) did not attend the caucus, and issued a statement opposing Allds.

The Legislature met for the regular session at the State Capitol in Albany on January 5, 1910; and adjourned on May 27.

James Wolcott Wadsworth, Jr. (R) was re-elected Speaker.

Jotham P. Allds (R) was elected president pro tempore of the State Senate.

On January 18, the press published that Senator Benn Conger accused Allds of having demanded and received bribes.

On January 19, Allds demanded an investigation by the State Senate.

On January 30, Conger filed the accusation before the State Senate, stating that Allds had "demanded, received and accepted $1,000 on or about April 23, 1901, in consideration for his failure to pass a certain bill then pending before the Assembly."

On February 3, Allds answered the accusation with a denial.

On February 8 and 9, Hiram G. Moe testified before the investigating committee that he had handed over the envelope containing the money.;

On February 23, Allds resigned the Presidency pro tempore.

On March 11, George H. Cobb was elected president pro tempore of the State Senate.

On March 29, the State Senate found Allds guilty by a vote of 40 to 9, but Allds had resigned just before the begin of the session to avoid expulsion.

On April 4, Conger resigned his seat, and retired from politics.

The Legislature met for a special session at the State Capitol in Albany on June 20, 1910; and adjourned on July 1. This session was called to consider legislation to abolish party conventions, and nominate candidates for office by primary elections instead. This measure had met with fierce resistance from the party bosses. The "Hinman-Green bill" (which proposed this change) had been defeated in the Senate and in the Assembly. The "Cobb compromise" (amending the Hinman-Green bill) had passed the State Senate, but was defeated in the Assembly on May 27.

On June 30, the "Cobb Direct Nominations bill" was defeated in the Assembly by a vote of 80 to 63.

On July 1, the State Senate also defeated the Cobb bill, with a vote of 25 for and 19 against it (one vote short of the necessary 26 to approve). The Legislature enacted a "Progressive Inheritance Tax bill", and then adjourned.

State Senate

Districts

Members
The asterisk (*) denotes members of the previous Legislature who continued in office as members of this Legislature.

Note: For brevity, the chairmanships omit the words "the Committee on (the)" from the titles of committees.  The chairmanships are listed as appointed at the beginning of the session. The President pro tempore is ex officio Chairman of the Committee on Rules.

Employees
 Clerk: Lafayette B. Gleason
 Sergeant-at-Arms: Charles R. Hotaling
 Assistant Sergeant-at-Arms: John W. Burns
 Principal Doorkeeper: Christopher Warren
 Stenographer: Carlton J. Barnes

State Assembly

Assemblymen
Note: For brevity, the chairmanships omit the words "the Committee on (the)" from the titles of committees.

Employees
 Clerk: Ray B. Smith
 Sergeant-at-Arms:
Postmaster: James H. Underwood

Notes

Sources
 Official New York from Cleveland to Hughes by Charles Elliott Fitch (Hurd Publishing Co., New York and Buffalo, 1911, Vol. IV; see pg. 358f for assemblymen; and 366f for senators)
 Proceedings of the Senate in the Matter of the Investigation Demanded by Senator Jotham P. Allds (1910)
 DEMOCRATS GAIN IN THE ASSEMBLY in NYT on November 3, 1909
 CAUCUS NAMES ALLDS; EIGHT SENATORS OUT in NYT on January 5, 1910
 HILL IS CHAIRMAN OF FINANCE COMMITTEE in Utica Herald Dispatch

133
1910 in New York (state)
1910 U.S. legislative sessions